The Lufthansa heist was a robbery at New York City's John F. Kennedy International Airport on December 11, 1978. An estimated $5.875 million (equivalent to $ million in ) was stolen, with $5 million in cash and $875,000 in jewelry, making it the largest cash robbery committed on American soil at the time.

Jimmy Burke, a Lucchese crime family associate, was reputed to be the mastermind of the robbery, but was never officially charged in connection with the crime. Burke is also alleged to have either committed or ordered the murders of many of those involved in the months following the robbery to avoid being implicated in the heist. The only person convicted in the robbery was Louis Werner, an airport worker who helped plan the heist.

The money and jewelry have never been recovered. The heist's magnitude made it one of the longest-investigated crimes in the United States; the latest arrest associated with the robbery was made in 2014, which resulted in acquittal.

Planning
The heist was allegedly planned by Jimmy Burke, an associate of the Lucchese crime family, and carried out by several associates. The plot began when bookmaker Martin Krugman told Henry Hill (an associate of Burke's) that Lufthansa flew in currency to its cargo terminal at John F. Kennedy International Airport. The information had originally come from Louis Werner, a worker at the airport who owed Krugman $20,000 for gambling debts, and from his co-worker Peter Gruenwald. Werner and Gruenwald had previously been successful in stealing $22,000 in foreign currency from their employer Lufthansa in 1976.

Burke decided on Tommy DeSimone, Angelo Sepe, Louis Cafora, Joe Manri, Paolo LiCastri, and Robert McMahon as the robbers. Burke's son Frank would drive one of the back up vehicles and Parnell "Stacks" Edwards' job was to dispose of the van afterwards. Depending on his role in the robbery, each participant was to receive $10,000 to $50,000. However, those amounts were based on the estimated haul, which was only $2 million compared to the actual take of $5.875 million. Werner was to receive a flat 10% of the take.

Heist
At around 3 a.m. on Monday, December 11, 1978, the six men in a black Ford Econoline van pulled up to the Lufthansa cargo building 261. The padlock on the gate was cut with a pair of bolt cutters. Some of the crew climbed up the stairs of the east tower and entered wearing ski masks and gloves. A late model Buick was positioned in the terminal parking lot with its lights off.

Inside the terminal, John Murray, a senior cargo agent, was the first employee to be taken hostage. He was walked into the lunchroom where five other Lufthansa employees were on their meal break since 3:00 a.m. and ordered to lie flat on the floor with their eyes closed. Murray was asked who else was in the warehouse. He said that Rudi Eirich, the night shift cargo traffic manager, and Kerry Whalen, a cargo transfer agent, were there. Murray was forced to lure Eirich to come upstairs; he joined the rest of the captured employees.

Outside the terminal, Whalen noticed two unmasked men sitting in a black van parked at the Lufthansa cargo building 261 ramp as he drove past. Whalen parked and walked toward the van. One of the men told him to get in the van. Whalen screamed for help as he ran, but was pistol-whipped and thrown into the van. He was brought to join the other hostages in the lunchroom.

Inside the warehouse, employee Rolf Rebmann heard a noise by the loading ramp and went to investigate; he was captured and brought with Whalen to the lunchroom to join the others. Some of the robbers took Eirich at gunpoint to the double-door vault. They removed 72 15-pound cartons of untraceable money from the vault and placed them in the van.

At 4:21 a.m., the van pulled to the front of the building and the crash car pulled in behind. Two gunmen climbed in the van as the others got into the Buick. The employees were told not to call the Port Authority Police until 4:30 a.m., when the first call to the police was recorded.

The robbers drove to meet Burke at an auto repair shop in Canarsie, Brooklyn. The boxes of money were removed from the van and placed in the trunks of the two automobiles. Burke and his son drove off in one car. Four others — Manri, McMahon, DeSimone, and Sepe — drove away in the second car.

Aftermath

Investigation
Parnell "Stacks" Edwards had failed to get rid of the van that had been used in the heist. Edwards was supposed to have driven the vehicle to New Jersey, where it (along with any potential evidence inside) was to be destroyed in a junk yard belonging to John Gotti. Instead, Edwards parked the van in front of a fire hydrant at his girlfriend's apartment, where police discovered it two days after the heist. Paul Vario subsequently ordered DeSimone to kill Edwards. Once he found out where Edwards was hiding, DeSimone and Angelo Sepe visited Edwards and shot him five times in the head. From the van, fingerprints were lifted of several perpetrators of the robbery.

The FBI identified the Burke crew as the likely perpetrators within three days of the robbery, largely due to the discovery of the van, coupled with Edwards' pre-established connections with the Burke gang at Robert's Lounge. They set up heavy surveillance, following the gang in helicopters and bugging their vehicles, the phones at Robert's Lounge, and even the payphones nearest to the bar. The FBI managed to record a few bits of tantalizing chatter despite the background sounds of rock and disco music, such as Angelo Sepe telling an unidentified man about "a brown case and a bag from Lufthansa" and his telling his girlfriend Hope Barron, "...I want to see...look where the money's at...dig a hole in the cellar [inaudible] rear lawn..." But this was not enough to definitively connect Burke's crew to the heist, and no search warrants were issued.

According to Henry Hill, Jimmy Burke became paranoid and agitated once he realized how much attention Edwards' failure had drawn, and resolved to kill anyone who could implicate him in the heist, starting with Edwards himself. With the murders of most of the heist associates and planners, little evidence and few witnesses remained connecting Burke or his crew to the heist. However, the authorities were eventually able to gather enough evidence to prosecute inside man Louis Werner for helping to plan the heist. Werner was the only man convicted of the robbery, in 1979, and was sentenced to 15 years in prison. Lucchese crime family associate Donald Frankos later expressed frustration with being a close friend of Burke's and regular habitué at Robert's Lounge but not involved in the actual heist, in his biography Contract Killer: The Explosive Story of the Mafia's Most Notorious Hit Man Donald "The Greek" Frankos.

Later, when Whalen was interrogated by the authorities, he was shown police archive photos and positively identified one of his assailants as Angelo Sepe. Eirich later reported that the robbers were well informed and knew all about the safety systems in the vault, including the double-door system, whereby one door must be shut in order for the other one to be opened without activating the alarm. The robbers ordered Eirich to open up the first door to a 10-by-20-foot room. They knew that if he opened the second door, he would activate an alarm to the Port Authority Police unit at the airport.

Vincent Asaro, a high-ranking member of the Bonanno crime family, was arrested on January 23, 2014, in conjunction with an indictment charging him with involvement in the Lufthansa heist; his cousin, Gaspare Valenti, was testifying against him. The case against Asaro was based on an informant who was referred to by Asaro's attorney as "one of the worst witnesses I've ever seen." Daniel Simone, who co-authored the book The Lufthansa Heist, in collaboration with Henry Hill, reported to the New York Post's Page Six that Hill told him that Asaro had "no involvement" in the robbery. On November 12, 2015, Asaro was acquitted of all charges connected to the Lufthansa robbery by a jury in Federal District Court in Brooklyn.

The stolen cash and jewelry were never recovered.

Murders of heist associates
Burke also realized that Edwards' failure to dispose of the van had allowed the police to catch on to his crew, and Burke resolved to kill anyone who could implicate him in the heist. The first to be murdered, just seven days after the heist, was Edwards—shot and killed in his apartment on December 18, 1978, by Tommy DeSimone and Angelo Sepe. This was the first in a series of criminals and their acquaintances who were murdered after the heist at Burke's orders:

Others involved in the planning, execution, or followup of the heist who were killed, but not on Burke's orders in 1979.

Informants
 Janet Barbieri, Louis Werner's girlfriend and future wife, who testified against Werner before a Grand Jury.
 William "Bill" Fischetti, a taxi dispatch company owner and a mob relative who was involved in selling stolen bearer bonds.
 Peter Gruenwald, a Lufthansa heist organizer, who testified against his friend and fellow co-worker Louis Werner.
 Frank Menna, a numbers-runner who had been worked over by Angelo Sepe and Daniel Rizzo because of his boss Martin Krugman's incompetence.
 Louis Werner, a Manhattan accountant who doubled as a money launderer.

In April 1980, Henry Hill was arrested on unrelated narcotics charges. He became convinced that his former associates planned to have him killed: Vario, for dealing drugs; and Burke, to prevent Hill from implicating him in the heist. With a long sentence hanging over him, Hill agreed to become an informant and entered the Witness Protection Program with his family. He was not able to help the government obtain convictions against Vario or Burke for the Lufthansa heist, although both were convicted of other crimes as a result of his testimony.

Adaptations 
It is the main subject of two well-known television films – The 10 Million Dollar Getaway (1991) and The Big Heist (2001) – and is a key plot element in the film Goodfellas (1990).

See also
 List of large value US robberies

References

Further reading
 
 

 
Aviation in New York City
History of New York City
John F. Kennedy International Airport
Lucchese crime family heist
1978 crimes in the United States
1978 in New York City
1978 in aviation
Robberies in the United States
Crimes in Queens, New York
December 1978 events in the United States
December 1978 crimes
1970s in Queens